Love Is Alive may refer to:

Albums
 Love Is Alive: Works of 1985–2010, a 2010 compilation album by Eric Martin
 Love is Alive, a 2017 EP by Louis the Child

Songs
 "Love Is Alive" (Gary Wright song), from The Dream Weaver, 1975
 "Love Is Alive" (The Judds song), from Why Not Me, 1984
 "Love Is Alive" (Lea Michele song), from Places, 2017
 "Love is Alive", a song by Kate Ceberano from Pash, 1998
 "Love Is Alive", a song by Louis the Child featuring Elohim from Love Is Alive, 2013
 "Love is Alive", a 2013 song by Phil Vassar